The Tenderness of Wolves can refer to:

 The Tenderness of Wolves (film), a 1973 film
 The Tenderness of Wolves (novel), a 2006 novel